Cornwall Fire and Rescue Service is the statutory fire and rescue service covering Cornwall, England. , the service employs over 400 retained firefighters, 203 full-time firefighters, plus 170 support and administrative staff. 
Created under the Fire Services Act 1947 as "Cornwall Fire Brigade", the name changed to "Cornwall Fire and Rescue Service" on 1 October 2009. 

The service is administered by Cornwall Council, with a new service headquarters (SHQ) at Tolvaddon opened in 2015.

History
As part of the FiReControl project, the control room was planned to switch over to the regional control centre in Taunton, Somerset, that would be shared between neighbouring services in South West England. Originally scheduled to take place in July 2010, the cutover date was revised to January 2012,
however the plan was scrapped in December 2010.

Fire stations and appliances 

Cornwall Fire and Rescue Service operates 31 fire stations, which are organised into three service delivery areas: Mid, East and West. 

The fire stations are manned by three different systems: 
Wholetime  stations manned by four watches of wholetime fire fighters from 07:00 to 19:00, and 19:00 to 07:00. These stations are supported by retained firefighters.
Wholetime day  stations manned by two watches of wholetime firefighters from 07:00 to 19:00, and by retained firefighters at other times. 
On-call  stations manned by retained firefighters.

Cornwall Fire and Rescue Service works in partnership with South Western Ambulance Service to provide emergency medical cover to area of Cornwall. These are areas that have been identified as having a greater need for ambulance cover. The aim of a co-responder team is to preserve life until the arrival of either a rapid response vehicle (RRV) or an ambulance. Co-responder vehicles are equipped with oxygen and automated external defibrillator (AED) equipment, as is every one of the service's fire stations.

The service arranges its fire stations into three geographic areas:
East, Mid, and West.

Workshop and stores

The service workshop and stores are located at the Tolvaddon SHQ. The workshop contains five bays consisting of one HGV ramp bay, and one car & van ramp bay. The set-up enables up to five vehicles to be in the workshop at any one time.

The workshop also houses the stores, including both clothing and equipment, and holds over 7,000 items including operational equipment like branches and radios, and clothing from tunics to dress uniforms. This is always updated to ensure any equipment or clothing needed is ready to be dispatched immediately to wherever it is needed.

The workshops also maintain all of the operational equipment, from repairing the lengths of hoses to the breathing apparatus (BA) sets; this is carried out by the specialist "hose shop" also located on-site.

Emergency repair is available 24/7 through an "on call" system where mechanics take turns to provide 24-hour service if an appliance or equipment becomes defective.

Performance
In 2018/2019, every fire and rescue service in England and Wales was subjected to a statutory inspection by Her Majesty's Inspectorate of Constabulary and Fire & Rescue Services (HIMCFRS). Another cycle of inspections was carried out starting in 2021.The inspections investigate how well the service performs in each of three areas. On a scale of outstanding, good, requires improvement and inadequate, Cornwall Fire and Rescue Service was rated as follows:

Mutual assistance

The Fire and Rescue Services Act 2004, gives fire services the power to assist other fire services or fire authorities in what is known as mutual assistance.

The fire services that adjoin Cornwall are as follows:
 Devon and Somerset Fire and Rescue Service
 Newquay Cornwall Airport Fire and Rescue Service

Notable incidents
SS Torrey Canyon disaster, 18 March 1967  This incident saw possibly the largest fire brigade attendance in UK history: 78 different brigades (with over 200 appliances, 147 of which responded from London Fire Brigade) and 38 different military units spread detergent and pumped out contaminated water. The clean-up lasted months and the brigades stayed on-site throughout working 24/7. Cornwall Fire Brigade set up a workshop near the Lizard to maintain the appliances on-site whilst refilling them and portable pumps with petrol. At the height of the operation over 1,600 personnel were on scene.

Boscastle flooding, 16 August 2004  The first call came into Fire Control in Truro at 16:00 to report a person trapped in a car with the water rising. At 17:30 a major incident was declared and search and rescue helicopters from RNAS Culdrose along with other helicopters throughout the Southwest assisted the fire brigade and Coastguard in evacuating people. 25 appliances attended the scene along with a further 22 for relief purposes. Although the brigade could not do anything with regards to the pumping out of water they assisted searching for persons trapped in their cars and homes and helped bring them to safety via the RNAS search and rescue helicopter. The brigade also carried out salvage work once the water had receded. The brigade were in attendance for a number of days with nearly the whole of the brigades pumping resources in attendance as either first response or as a relief crew.

Penhallow Hotel fire, 18 August 2007  The first 999 call was received at 00:17; crews from Newquay were first on-scene and requested further appliances to attend. The fire consumed all three floors of the hotel and three people died at the scene. 25 pumps attended along with many support appliances; Devon and Somerset Fire and Rescue Service also provided a turntable ladder, officers and USAR assistance. The cause of the fire is believed to be arson, but no one was ever charged. After the tragic incident questions were raised about the retained staffing levels at Newquay fire station and the brigade's lack of operational aerial ladder platforms.

A+P Falmouth Docks fire, 17 June 2011  At around 8:00, a worker was changing over an acetylene cylinder when the tank began to vent and the gas ignited; this in turn ignited other venting tanks. On arrival of the fire brigade a  cordon was put in place which required the docks and many surrounding houses to be evacuated. The brigade extinguished the initial fire but then had to cool the cylinders constantly for 24-hours to prevent them from exploding due to the heat and build-up of pressure. In total Cornwall FRS sent six pumping appliances, one command support unit, one operational support unit and one welfare vehicle. The incident lasted for 24-hours and required numerous relief crews to attend overnight.

Other emergency services
 Cornwall Air Ambulance
 South Western Ambulance Service
 Devon and Cornwall Constabulary
 HM Coastguard
 Royal National Lifeboat Institution (RNLI)

See also

 List of British firefighters killed in the line of duty

References

Further reading
Books by Arthur Ivan Rabey:
1981: Cornwall's Fire Brigades. St. Columb: I. Rabey
1998: Cornwall County Fire Brigade 1948 - 1998: the first 50 years. St. Columb: I. Rabey
2003: The Centenary of St. Columb Fire Brigade, 1903-2003. St Columb: [the Author]

External links

Cornwall Fire and Rescue Service at HMICFRS

Fire and rescue services of England
Organisations based in Cornwall